Losheim am See is a municipality in the district Merzig-Wadern, in Saarland, Germany. It is situated on the southern ridge of the Hunsrück, approximately 10 kilometers northeast of Merzig, and 35 kilometers northwest of Saarbrücken. In 1974 a reservoir was created in the north of Losheim that has become a popular spot for recreational activities such as hiking and swimming.

Losheim am See is twinned with the following municipalities:
Capannori, Italy 
Lacroix-Saint-Ouen, France
Copargo, Benin
Bokungu, Democratic Republic of the Congo
Mount Gilead, North Carolina, United States

Municipal organization 
The municipality is composed of 12 villages: Bachem, Bergen, Britten, Hausbach, Losheim, Mitlosheim, Niederlosheim, Rimlingen, Rissenthal, Scheiden, Wahlen and Waldhölzbach.

Politics

Municipal council 
Since the municipal election of 25 May 2014, the municipal council is composed as follows:

 CDU - 14 seats (43.1%) 
 SPD - 12 seats (34.7%) 
 Linke - 1 seats (4.7%) [in SPD Group] 
 FL / BD - 4 seats (11.8%) 
 GAL - 2 seats (5.8%)

Mayor 

 1972–1990: Raimund Jakobs (CDU) 
 1990–1995: Reinhard Reis (CDU) 
 1995–2019: Lothar Christ (SPD)
 2019–incumbent: Helmut Harth (independent)

Sights 

 Lake Losheim (31 ha)
 Museum railway Merzig-Bueschfelder railway (to Merzig) and railway museum
 Eight certified premium hiking trails certified by the Deutsche Wanderinstitut e. V.
 Parish Church of St. Peter and Paul (Losheim am See)
 State-recognized resorts: Losheim, Britten, Scheiden, Waldhölzbach and Mitlosheim

References

Merzig-Wadern